Chris Tarrant: Extreme Railways, also known as Chris Tarrant: Extreme Railway Journeys, is a British television documentary series presented by Chris Tarrant for Channel 5. In the series, Tarrant travels worldwide to visit railways that go through the harshest terrain. He also travels on railways that are some of the world's oldest and most scenic, and finds out their history. So far, six series of the programme have aired since December 2012.

History 
Chris Tarrant was approached by Channel 5 to present three railway documentary episodes in 2012, and the result was Tarrant's trips to Congo, Australia and India, under the name Extreme Railways. Radio and television composers David Lowe and Simon Darlow provided music for the series. Three years later, a second series was aired, titled Chris Tarrant: Extreme Railway Journeys. As of 2020, six series have been produced.

On 12 March 2014, it was reported that Tarrant had suffered a mini stroke during a flight from Bangkok to London on 1 March 2014 while returning from overseas shooting for the programme. Upon landing, he was rushed to Charing Cross Hospital where doctors did emergency surgery to remove a blood clot from his right leg.

Series overview

Episodes

Season 1 (2012)

Season 2 (2015)

Season 3 (2016)

Season 4 (2017–18)

Season 5 (2019)

Season 6 (2019)

Home media 
So far, series 1 to 4 of Chris Tarrant: Extreme Railways have been released on DVD.

References

External links 
 

2012 British television series debuts
2010s British documentary television series
2020s British documentary television series
Documentary television series about railway transport
English-language television shows
Channel 5 (British TV channel) original programming